The Jamyang Zhepas are a lineage of tulkus of the Gelug school of Tibetan Buddhism. They have traditionally been the most prestigious teachers at Labrang Monastery in Amdo, Tibet (modern Gansu, China).

1st Jamyang Zhepa 
The first Jamyang Zhepa, Ngawang Tsöndrü (1648–1721), was a native of Amdo and, after studying at Drepung Monastery near Lhasa, was invited by the local Mongol king to return and teach Buddhism there. There, Ngawang Tsöndrü later founded Labrang, one of the two great monasteries of Amdo. As the first Jamyang Zhepa was educated at Drepung, the lineage has subsequently belonged the Gelug.

Ngawang Tsöndrü was a great scholar. He wrote Roar of the Five-Faced [Lion], a series of verses on tenets, along with a massive commentary to the root text (around 530 folios), called Great Exposition on Tenets. According to Daniel Cozort, Jamyang's works "are the most comprehensive of the tenets texts" (in Tibetan Buddhism). He also wrote various textbooks which are used today in numerous Gelug colleges.

According to renowned TibetanLegends: Actually Jamyang zhenpa got super hate with Nyingmapa tradition and its scholar like Minling Lochen Dharmashri due to 5th the Dalai Lama, Desi Sang gyas rgyatso and 6th The Dalai Lama Tsang-yang gyatso, all were influenced Nyingma school cause Minling Monastery. furthermore 5th Dalai Lama respected more to Minling Lochen than him. So he kept this hatred and seek revenge. So one time he went to Amdo which his homeland that time he got chance plotting with Mongol Dzungar. then He led Dzungar troop to Mindroling and Dorje Drak monasteries. When they reached to Nagqu (Nagchu) he went to Tsang Tashi lhunpo as he pretened to no related this great sin. Of course Dzungar troop dirctly fowarded to Lhokkha and destroyed 2 more monasteries and excused (cut off heads) Minling Lochen, Dodrak Rinzin Pema trinly and 8 hundreds monks. We can know this legend talked masscre was truth and related to Jamyang zhepa. His close flollower Setsang wrote about he got how much hate and resentful to Minling Lochen in his biography titlle "namthar tsenpoma" or "rje btsun dam pa mtshan brjod par dka' ba 'jam dbyang bzhed pa'i rdo rje'i rnam par thar pa yongs su brjod pa'i gtam du bya ba dad pa'i sgo 'byed kai ta ka"

2nd Jamyang Zhepa 
Gönchok Jikmé Ongpo (1728–1791), is also known for his shorter tenets text called Precious Garland of Tenets as well as other works on the bodhisattva path, the Presentation of the Grounds and Paths, Beautiful Ornament of the Three Vehicles.

6th Jamyang Zhepa 

The current Jamyang Zhepa is the 6th, Lobsang Jigme Thubten Chökyi Nyima (born 1948). During the Cultural Revolution, he became a layman and married. Tibetan Buddhist teachers may be either laypersons or monks, but the Jamyang Zhepas used to be  traditionally monks. He lives in Lanzhou, the capital of Gansu.

References

Tulkus